K. K. Nagar may refer to:

K. K. Nagar, Chennai, Tamil Nadu, India
K. K. Nagar, Madurai, Tamil Nadu, India
K. K. Nagar, Tiruchirappalli, Tamil Nadu, India.